In Greek mythology, Chloris (Ancient Greek Χλωρίς Khlōris, from χλωρός khlōros, meaning "greenish-yellow", "pale green", "pale", "pallid" or "fresh") was a Minyan princess.

Family 
Chloris was the youngest daughter of King Amphion of Orchomenus, son of Iasus, son of Persephone, daughter of Minyas. She was often confused with another Chloris, one of the Niobids, children of another Amphion by Niobe. 

Chloris was said to have married Neleus and become queen in Pylos. They had twelve sons including Nestor, Alastor and Chromius - named in Book 11 of the Odyssey - a daughter Pero. Chloris also gave birth to Periclymenus while married to Neleus, though by some accounts Periclymenus's father was Poseidon (who was himself Neleus's father as well). Poseidon gave Periclymenus the ability to transform into any animal. Other children include Taurus, Asterius, Pylaon, Deimachus, Eurybius, Phrasius, Eurymenes, Evagoras and Epilaus (or Epileon). Some say that Chloris was mother only of three of Neleus' sons (Nestor, Periclymenus and Chromius), whereas the rest were his children by different women, but other accounts explicitly disagree with the statement.

Mythology 

Odysseus is said to have encountered Chloris on his journey to Hades. Pausanias describes a painting by Polygnotus of Chloris among other notable women in the underworld, leaning against the knees of her friend Thyia.

Notes

References 

 Apollodorus, The Library with an English Translation by Sir James George Frazer, F.B.A., F.R.S. in 2 Volumes, Cambridge, MA, Harvard University Press; London, William Heinemann Ltd. 1921. . Online version at the Perseus Digital Library. Greek text available from the same website.
Diodorus Siculus, The Library of History translated by Charles Henry Oldfather. Twelve volumes. Loeb Classical Library. Cambridge, Massachusetts: Harvard University Press; London: William Heinemann, Ltd. 1989. Vol. 3. Books 4.59–8. Online version at Bill Thayer's Web Site
 Diodorus Siculus, Bibliotheca Historica. Vol 1-2. Immanel Bekker. Ludwig Dindorf. Friedrich Vogel. in aedibus B. G. Teubneri. Leipzig. 1888-1890. Greek text available at the Perseus Digital Library.
 Homer, The Odyssey with an English Translation by A.T. Murray, PH.D. in two volumes. Cambridge, MA., Harvard University Press; London, William Heinemann, Ltd. 1919. Online version at the Perseus Digital Library. Greek text available from the same website.
 Pausanias, Description of Greece with an English Translation by W.H.S. Jones, Litt.D., and H.A. Ormerod, M.A., in 4 Volumes. Cambridge, MA, Harvard University Press; London, William Heinemann Ltd. 1918. . Online version at the Perseus Digital Library
Pausanias, Graeciae Descriptio. 3 vols. Leipzig, Teubner. 1903.  Greek text available at the Perseus Digital Library.
 Strabo, The Geography of Strabo. Edition by H.L. Jones. Cambridge, Mass.: Harvard University Press; London: William Heinemann, Ltd. 1924. Online version at the Perseus Digital Library.
 Strabo, Geographica edited by A. Meineke. Leipzig: Teubner. 1877. Greek text available at the Perseus Digital Library.
Tzetzes, John, Allegories of the Iliad translated by Goldwyn, Adam J. and Kokkini, Dimitra. Dumbarton Oaks Medieval Library, Harvard University Press, 2015. 

Princesses in Greek mythology
Queens in Greek mythology
Minyan characters in Greek mythology
Mythology of Pylos